Volga is a rural locality (a settlement) in Pervomaysky Selsoviet, Pervomaysky District, Altai Krai, Russia. The population was 168 as of 2013. There are 2 streets.

Geography 
Volga is located 34 km north of Novoaltaysk (the district's administrative centre) by road. Pervomayskoye is the nearest rural locality.

References 

Rural localities in Pervomaysky District, Altai Krai